The 2018 Washington State Cougars football team represented Washington State University during the 2018 NCAA Division I FBS football season. The team played their home games in Martin Stadium in Pullman, Washington. They were led by 7th-year head coach Mike Leach and were members of the North Division of the Pac-12 Conference.

The 2018 season was one of the greatest in Washington State history. The Cougars won a school record-tying ten games, the first time they had won that many in the regular season since the Rose Bowl year of 2002. They also surged as high as seventh in major polling and went into the Apple Cup with a chance to clinch the Pac-12 North title and a shot at the Rose Bowl, but lost 28–15 to rival Washington in the snow in Pullman, a sixth consecutive loss to the Huskies. The  Cougars were invited to the Alamo Bowl in San Antonio to play the Iowa State Cyclones. They won 28–26 for a school record 11th win.

Mike Leach's air raid offense was led by grad transfer quarterback Gardner Minshew, who led FBS in passing completions and attempts, and finished second in passing yards. Minshew was named Pac-12 Offensive Player of the Year and was the recipient of the Johnny Unitas Golden Arm Award. He and offensive tackle Andre Dillard were named first-team all-conference. Redshirt freshman offensive tackle Abraham Lucas was named to several national all-freshman teams, and was joined on the all-conference second-team by defensive end Logan Tago. Mike Leach was named Pac-12 Coach of the Year for the second time of his career.

Previous season
The Cougars finished the 2017 season 9–4, 6–3 in Pac-12 play to finish in third place in the North Division. They were invited to the Holiday Bowl where they lost to Michigan State.

Preseason

Award watch lists
Listed in the order that they were released

Pac-12 Media Days
The 2018 Pac-12 media days were held July 25, 2018 in Hollywood, California. Mike Leach (HC), Kyle Sweet (WR/P) & Jalen Thompson (S) represented Washington State at this event. The Pac-12 media poll was released with the Cougars predicted to finish in fifth place at Pac-12 North division.

Schedule

Rankings

Game summaries

at Wyoming

San Jose State

Eastern Washington

at USC

Utah

at Oregon State

Oregon

at Stanford

California

at Colorado

Arizona

Washington

vs. Iowa State (Alamo Bowl)

Awards

Pac-12 Offensive Player of the Year: Gardner Minshew II
Pac-12 Coach of the Year: Mike Leach

NFL Draft

References

Washington State
Washington State Cougars football seasons
Alamo Bowl champion seasons
Washington State Cougars football